Noli de Castro, nicknamed "Kabayan", is a Filipino journalist and politician who served as the 12th Vice President of the Philippines and the current anchor of TV Patrol and the current anchor of Kabayan.

Kabayan may also refer to:
Kabayan (radio program), a radio program hosted by Noli de Castro
Kabayan, Benguet, a municipality in the Philippines
Kabayan (fictional character), a Sudanese folklore character
Kabalikat ng Mamamayan, a party-list abbreviated as KABAYAN